Pac is a village located in the administrative territorial entity of Bytyç, belonging to the municipality of Tropojë, in northern Albania.

References 

Administrative units of Tropojë